Klondike Adventure is a 1982 video game published by SoftSide for the Atari 8-bit family. It was the February 1982 Adventure of the Month, and the ninth in the series.

Contents
Klondike Adventure is a text-based adventure game in which the player must recover five missing treasures from the arctic.

Reception
Bruce Campbell reviewed Klondike Adventure in The Space Gamer No. 61. Campbell commented that "I enjoyed the unique setting as well as the puzzles presented by Klondike. [...] For a relatively simple adventure, Klondike is a good buy.  If you get stuck, try yelling."

References

External links 
 

1980s interactive fiction
1982 video games
Atari 8-bit family games